Waben is a commune in the Pas-de-Calais department in the Hauts-de-France region of France.

Geography
Waben is located 8 miles (13 km) southwest of Montreuil-sur-Mer, at the D143 and D940 road junction, about a kilometre from the sea at the estuary of the Authie.

Population

Places of interest
 The church of the Nativité-de-Notre-Dame.

See also
Communes of the Pas-de-Calais department

References

Communes of Pas-de-Calais